Derrell Dixon (born October 31, 1970 in Portland, OR) is an American former professional boxer who competed from 1997 to 2001. As an amateur, he was a two-time United States Amateur Heavyweight Champion.

Amateur career
Dixon had an outstanding amateur career prior to turning professional. He won the National AAU Heavyweight Championship in 1993 and 1994.

Professional career
Known as "Double D", Dixon turned professional in 2000 and had limited success. He came up short in each attempt to step up in competition, losing fights to future contenders Owen Beck, Friday Ahunanya, Serguei Lyakhovich, and China Smith.

External links
 

1970 births
Living people
Boxers from Portland, Oregon
Winners of the United States Championship for amateur boxers
American male boxers
Heavyweight boxers